The Deputy President of the Supreme Court of the United Kingdom is the second most senior judge of the Supreme Court of the United Kingdom, after the President of the Supreme Court. The office is equivalent to the now-defunct position of Second Senior Lord of Appeal in Ordinary, also known previously as the Second Senior Law Lord, who was the second highest-ranking Lord of Appeal in Ordinary.

By Royal Warrant of Queen Elizabeth II published on 1 October 2009, a place for the Deputy President of the Supreme Court in the order of precedence was established: the Deputy President of the Supreme Court ranks after the Master of the Rolls and before the other Justices of the Supreme Court.

List of Second Senior Lords of Appeal in Ordinary
 The Lord Goff of Chieveley (1994 – 1996)
 The Lord Slynn of Hadley (2000 – 2002)
 The Lord Nicholls of Birkenhead (2002 – 2007)
 The Lord Hoffman (2007 – 2009)
 The Lord Hope of Craighead (20 April 2009 – 1 October 2009)

List of Deputy Presidents of the Supreme Court

References

External links 
 The Supreme Court

Law lords
 
Lists of judges in the United Kingdom
Judiciaries of the United Kingdom
Deputy President